William Foulke may refer to:

 William Dudley Foulke, American poet and reformer
 William Parker Foulke, American paleontologist
 William Foulke (footballer), known as William "Fatty" Foulke, English football (soccer) player

Similar names
 William Foulkes (disambiguation)
 William "Bill" Foulk, participant in the Ash Street shootout